Ane Pérez Etxeberria (born 25 October 1994), most commonly known as Puyi, is a Spanish footballer who plays as a defender for Eibar.

Club career
Puyi started her career at Oiartzun.

References

External links
Profile at La Liga

1994 births
Living people
Women's association football defenders
Spanish women's footballers
People from Errenteria
Sportspeople from Gipuzkoa
Footballers from the Basque Country (autonomous community)
Oiartzun KE players
SD Eibar Femenino players
Primera División (women) players
Segunda Federación (women) players
Primera Federación (women) players